Frederick John "Frock" Lowrey (August 12, 1902 – January 24, 1968) was a Canadian professional ice hockey defenceman who played 54 games in the National Hockey League for the Pittsburgh Pirates and Montreal Maroons. Fred is the brother of former NHL players Eddie and Gerry Lowrey. Three other brothers – Tom, Frank and Bill – played with lower level teams in the Ottawa City Hockey League.

Career statistics

Regular season and playoffs

External links
 

1902 births
1968 deaths
Buffalo Majors players
Canadian ice hockey defencemen
Ice hockey people from Ottawa
London Panthers players
Montreal Maroons players
New Haven Bears players
Ontario Hockey Association Senior A League (1890–1979) players
Philadelphia Arrows players
Pittsburgh Pirates (NHL) players
Pittsburgh Yellow Jackets (IHL) players
Quebec Castors players